Fitzroy Island (originally Koba or Gabar) is a continental island offshore from Cape Grafton, 29 km (18 miles) southeast of Cairns, Queensland, Australia. It is a locality in the Cairns Region.

Geography
Fitzroy Island is a large tropical island, with a rainforest covering and its own fringe coral reef system.  The island has a total area of 339 hectares (838 acres).  The highest point of the island is 269 metres (883') above sea level.

Fitzroy Island is a 45-minute ferry ride (about 30 km; 20 miles) from Cairns and is surrounded by a reef system that forms part of the Great Barrier Reef Marine Park.  Nearly all of the continental island is protected within the Fitzroy Island National Park.  It is covered in tropical rainforest.  Four walking tracks have been established.

Climate

Fitzroy enjoys a typical North Queensland tropical climate but with the added advantage of the cooling effects of the prevailing southeasterly ocean breezes for the majority of the year. Temperatures range from 24 - 31 C (75 - 88 F) in summer and 19 - 25 C (66 - 77 F) in winter.

History
The island separated from the mainland about 8000 years ago, at the end of the last ice age. There were Aboriginal visits, mainly for visiting hunting trips and recreation. The Yidiny people named the island "Gabaɽ", meaning "lower arm", because of how it was partially submerged.

Lieutenant James Cook named the island in 1770 after Augustus Henry Fitzroy. The island was used for a considerable time as a significant Chinese quarantine station for the Queensland goldfields. Subsequently, it was used as a mission school and, during World War II, as a coast watch station.

The island has also been a significant lighthouse base, with the last permanent lighthouse structures on the main island still being an important community attraction. Since the lighthouse closed, the marine community has been served by an automatic lighthouse, based on the adjacent Little Fitzroy Island. There has been both a giant clam farm at Welcome Bay, and there is now a tourist resort and day visitor centre.

Attractions
The island is home to a 100-room resort. Originally opened in 1981, property developer Doug Gamble bought and renovated the resort in 2010. The resort manages the camping area.

See also 

 List of islands of Australia

References

External links

Islands of Queensland
Islands of Far North Queensland
Great Barrier Reef
Australian Aboriginal mythology
Cultural landscapes of North-East Queensland
Suburbs of Cairns
Localities in Queensland